Teodosio Lares he was a Mexican lawyer and politician. He studied Philosophy and Jurisprudence in the Seminary of Guadalajara. In 1827 he began his career as a lawyer in the Supreme Court of the State of Jalisco. He returned to Zacatecas, where he was magistrate of the Supreme Court of Justice. In 1836 he was director of the Literary Institute of Zacatecas. In 1848 he was deputy to the General Congress for the state of Zacatecas. In 1850 he was appointed senator of the Tercio by the Chamber of Deputies.

From 1858 to 1860, during the War of Reform, he was Minister of Justice in the presidencies of Félix María Zuloaga and Miguel Miramón. In 1863, during the French intervention, he was Minister of the Supreme Court of Justice of the Regency.

From 1866 to 1867, during the rule of Maximilian of Habsburg, he was president of the Supreme Court of Justice, and president of the Council of Ministers of the Empire. He was decorated as Commander of the Imperial Order of the Mexican Eagle and with the First Class Medal for Civil Merit.

References 

Mexican Empire
19th-century Mexican politicians
19th-century Mexican lawyers
Mexican monarchists
1806 births
1870 deaths
Politicians from Aguascalientes